Wimsheim is a municipality in the Enz district of Baden-Württemberg, Germany.

History
Wimsheim became a possession of Maulbronn Monastery in 1232. When the monastery was annexed by the Duchy of Württemberg, Wimsheim naturally became a possession of the Duke of Württemberg. The town continued to be governed from Maulbronn via an administrative district, made  on 18 March 1806, until the district's dissolution on 1 October 1938.

In 1941,  of land along Bundesautobahn 5 was made a protected landscape.

Geography
The geology of the municipal area is made up of two distinct regions. The west is described by the Heckengäu's wooded and karstified muschelkalk hills, while the east is made up by Black Forest buntsandstein. Elevation above sea level in the municipality ranges from a low of  Normalnull (NN) on the Grenzbach to a high of  NN in the Brenntenhau.

Coat of arms
Wimsheim's coat of arms shows a golden trammel hook above a six-pointed star upon a field of blue. The oldest coat of arms associated with Wimsheim comes from the 19th century and was used by the office of its sheriff. The tincture was decided around 1947.

Citations

Enzkreis
Württemberg